Robert Neville (1404 – 8 or 9 July 1457) was an English prelate who served as Bishop of Salisbury and Bishop of Durham. He was also a provost of Beverley. He was born at Raby Castle. His father was Ralph Neville and his mother was Joan Beaufort, daughter of John of Gaunt. He was thus a highly placed member of the English aristocracy.

Neville was nominated Bishop of Salisbury on 9 July 1427, and consecrated on 26 October 1427. He was then translated to Durham on 27 January 1438.

Neville died on 8 July 1457.

Citations

References
 
 

1404 births
1457 deaths
Bishops of Durham
Bishops of Salisbury
15th-century English Roman Catholic bishops
Robert
Date of birth unknown
Younger sons of earls